Jennifer Lynn Holmes (born August 23, 1955, in Seekonk, Massachusetts) is an American television actress.

Holmes is best known for her role as Leslie Vanderkellen, a fabulously rich, world-class skier who takes the job of hotel maid to find out what it's like to be average,  on the first season of Newhart. She left the show after the first season and was replaced by Julia Duffy who portrayed Leslie's cousin, Stephanie Vanderkellen, for the remainder of the show's run.

Holmes also appeared in the 1979 slasher film The Demon, starring Cameron Mitchell, and acted opposite Mitchell again in the 1982 film Raw Force. She also appeared in the TV movie versions of Hobson's Choice (1983) and Samson and Delilah (1984). In 1985, she starred in Misfits of Science, a short-lived television series about a group of superheroes who fight crime for a scientific think tank.

In the 1980s, Holmes was also a guest star on many television shows, including Knight Rider, The Rockford Files, Lou Grant, Fame, Webster, The Love Boat, Murder, She Wrote, Hart to Hart, Voyagers!, as Mandy Jo on The Dukes of Hazzard and Tales of the Unexpected.

Jennifer Lynn Holmes was married on May 10, 1980, in Santa Clara County, California, to Mark J. Tanous, who was born June 25, 1955.

External links

1955 births
American television actresses
Living people
People from Seekonk, Massachusetts
Actresses from Massachusetts
20th-century American actresses
21st-century American women